Chariesthes analis is a species of beetle in the family Cerambycidae. It was described by Karl Jordan in 1894, originally under the genus Apheniastus. It has a wide distribution in Africa.

References

Chariesthes
Beetles described in 1894